E.S.P. is a 2008 Philippine television drama supernatural series broadcast by GMA Network. Directed by Argel Joseph, it stars Iza Calzado. It premiered on February 7, 2008 replacing Magpakailanman. The series concluded on May 8, 2008 with a total of 18 episodes.

The series is streaming online on YouTube.

Cast and characters

Lead cast
 Iza Calzado as Cassandra

Supporting cast
 Ricky Davao as Larson
 Alfred Vargas as Dave
 Pen Medina as Bestre
 Francine Prieto as Ivy
 Patricia Ismael as Anne

Episodes

Accolades

References

External links
 

2008 Philippine television series debuts
2008 Philippine television series endings
Filipino-language television shows
GMA Network drama series
Philippine horror fiction television series
Television shows set in the Philippines